Abdul Rehman Tukroo is a Kashmiri politician. As of 2014 he served as State Secretary of the Communist Party of India. He is a member of the National Council of the party. He served as Member of the Legislative Council of Jammu and Kashmir. He was elected to the Legislative Council from Kashmir province in 2001. His candidate was supported by the Jammu and Kashmir National Conference.

References

Living people
Communist Party of India politicians from Jammu and Kashmir
Year of birth missing (living people)
Place of birth missing (living people)